Eagle Investment Systems is an American global provider of financial services technology and a subsidiary of BNY Mellon. Founded in 1989 and based in Wellesley, Massachusetts, Eagle has 15 offices internationally, including offices in Beijing, Chennai, Dubai, London, Montreal, New York City, Pune, San Francisco, Singapore, Sydney and Toronto.

Products and services 

Eagle provides portfolio management, data management, investment accounting and performance measurement software  to financial institutions. The company uses a secure private cloud called Eagle Access to host and provide ongoing support of the applications and systems infrastructure, thereby helping to reduce complexity and risk.

Eagle clients 

Eagle Investment Systems' clients are global financial services companies, including investment management organizations, wealth management organizations, mutual fund companies, hedge funds, brokerage firms, banks, trusts, public sector organizations, plan sponsors, endowments and insurance companies.

Strategic alliances 

Eagle has established strategic relationships with a number of organizations that provide complementary products and services for their clients. In February 2011, Eagle integrated with FINCAD, a provider of derivative pricing and analytics, to incorporate FINCAD Analytics into Eagle's data management and performance measurement solutions.  In July 2012, Eagle announced a strategic relationship with MicroStrategy Incorporated, a business intelligence (BI) software vendor.

Company history

Eagle was founded in 1989 as a consulting firm focused on financial technology.  In 1996, Eagle launched Eagle PACE, the precursor to its current Data Management Solution, which was followed in 1999 by the launch of Eagle STAR, its Accounting Solution. In 2000, Eagle was rebranded to its current name, Eagle Investment Systems.

In 2000, Eagle opened a New York City office and in 2001 Eagle Investment Systems was acquired by Mellon Financial. In that same year, Eagle acquired ITS Associates and over the next two years opened both a London and Toronto office. In 2002, Eagle's ASP offering was rebranded as Eagle ACCESS, in 2003 the company launched its Performance Measurement Solution and in 2005 the Mutual Fund Accounting Solutions launched. The San Francisco office opened in 2006 and, in 2007, The Bank of New York (BNY) and Mellon Financial merged.  In 2009 a Singapore office was established.

In late 2011, Eagle relocated its headquarters from Newton, MA to Wellesley, MA.

Awards 

 Ten consecutive years on the FinTech 100, an annual international listing of the leading financial technology vendors named by American Banker, Bank Technology News and IDC Financial Insights. This ranking includes the top 100 global application/service providers in the financial services market, including the banking, capital markets and insurance industries.
Five consecutive years on IDC Financial Insights' FinTech Rankings.
FSOkx award for "Excellence in Performance Measurement (2013)
Buy-Side Technology Awards, "Best Buy-Side Technology Provider (2013)
FTF News, "Best Enterprise Management Solution"  (2013)
FTF News, "Best Buy-Side Operation Solutions"  (2013, 2014, 2015 and 2017)
FTF News, "Best Data Management Solution" (2016)
FTF News, "Best Middle Office Solution" (2017)
FTF News, "Best Cloud Computing Solution" (2018)
Custody Risk Americas, "Asset Servicing Technology Vendor of the Year" (2014, 2015 and 2017)
Waters Rankings, "Best Cloud-based Services Provider" (2018)

Management team 

Mal Cullen, Chairman

References

External links 
 
 BNY Mellon Technology Solutions
 The Wall Street Wiki
 Hoovers Profile

Financial services companies based in New York City
Financial software companies
Software companies based in New York City
Business software companies
Data management software
Defunct software companies of the United States